The French tariff of 1887 was a protectionist law passed by the National Assembly of the French Third Republic that imposed tariffs. It became law on 29 March 1885.

The 1885 tariff had increased the wheat duty to 3 francs per 100kg. The farmers had requested a duty of 5 francs and as soon as the 1885 law was passed they agitated for an increase. They claimed that home-grown produce could not cover its costs at the current price.

Rates
The duty on wheat was increased to 5 francs per 100kg; on oats to 3 francs; on flour to 8 francs; on beef and pork 12 francs, on bullocks 38 francs per head, on cows 20 francs per head. The duties on barley, butter, cheese, eggs, pigs and wine remained unchanged from 1885.

Notes

References
Percy Ashley, Modern Tariff History: Germany–United States–France (New York: Howard Fertig, 1970).
Paul Bairoch, 'European trade policy, 1815-1914', in Peter Mathias and Sidney Pollard (eds.), The Cambridge Economic History of Europe, Volume VIII: The Industrial Economies: The Development of Economic and Social Policies (Cambridge: Cambridge University Press, 1989), pp. 1-160.
Michael Tracy, Government and Agriculture in Western Europe, 1880–1988 (London: Harvester Wheatsheaf, 1989).

1887 in France
Economic history of France